Ikono is a Local Government Area of Akwa Ibom State, located in the South South of Nigeria. It is bounded at the North by Ini Local Government Area, South by Abak and Uyo Local Government Areas, East by Ibiono Ibom Local Government Area and West by Ikot Ekpene,Essien Udim and Obot Akara Local Government Areas. It was created a stand alone local government in september 1996. It is no doubt one of the four largest LGA in Akwa Ibom and also known as the cradle of the Ibibio people [Ntippe Ibibio]. It occupies the northern fringe of Akwa-Ibom State next to Ini local Government which occupies the northern most fringe of the state. It is predominantly inhabited by the Ibibios, the largest ethnic groups in the state. Some popular sub-groups within Ikono include Ukpom, Nung Ukim and Ediene.

History and population 
Ikono is one of the four largest Local Government Areas in the state, the others being oruk Anam, Ibiono-Ibom, Essien Udim. It came into existence in September, 1996 when it was carved out of Itu Local Government Area. The people of Ikono are great farmers, who cultivate both cash and food crops, palm tree, kolanut trees, cassava, maize, melon. They are also traders and among the peculiar cuisines of the people is a soup called "efere nsana" which is often prepared during festivities like marriage, burials, civic receptions.  The people of Ikono trace their roots to a place called "Ibom" in Arochukwu Local Government Area of Abia State, from where they migrated and spread to other parts today's Ibibio land.
Demographic suggestions made with much inclined on the 2016 census data, opines that Ikono has a population of about 185000 people, with both genders each fairly counting a proximate half of the total figure.

Sub-cultural groups 
Ibibio is made up of six sub-cultural groups.

These include:

 Eastern Ibibio or Ibibio Proper.
 Western Ibibio or Annang.
 Northern Ibibio or Enyong.
 Southern Ibibio or Oket.
 Delta Ibibio pr Andomilbeno.
 Riverine Ibibio or Efik.

Economy 
The economy of Ikono LGA is largely blazed by the civil service. Ikono LGA has stores of mineral assets like salt, sand and rock. Also, there are convincing indicators for unrefined petroleum. Agriculture is likewise a significant financial action in Ikono LGA with yields, for example, oil palm, kola nut, cocoa, melon, maize, cassava, and plantain filled in genuinely huge amounts inside the space.Exchange additionally prospers in Ikono LGA with the space facilitating various business sectors like the Obo daily market. Further more, the Fiongaran market situated a few kilometres away from the boundary community at the northern terrain has over the years been a major economic contributor. The people of Ikono in mild passivity participate in fishing, cottage craft [at Mbiabong Ikon, Mbiabong Ukan and other places] and lumbering.

Ikono towns and villages

Politics 
The political clime of the pre-democratic Ikono was overtly marshalled into the records by factors from the Ikono middle clan. The colonial administrators had a lot to do with such characters as Chief Ikpembe of Ibiaku Ntok Okpo and Chief Nyah Okoibu of Nung Ukim. 
By the end of the third republic, the merits of democracy, mixed with what many consider to be a state-authourity influenced schism, gradually favoured for more inclusiveness which has paved way for the people of the south to emerge as political front liners. The dominance of the south has been nevertheless toned into fairness, with the dominant political party PDP since 1999, running a quasi-zoning template with an equivalent power sharing formula.
Presently, the executive head is an Ikono-middle man. The legislative arm is operated with the councillor elements. The Judiciary is also stamped with customary recognitions.
The traditional hierarchies and monarchial stakes have been equally maintained with all permeable constutional rights sustained to run concurrently with the democratic government structures.

Infrastructures

References

Local Government Areas in Akwa Ibom State